The 2007/08 FIS Freestyle Skiing World Cup was the twenty ninth World Cup season in freestyle skiing organised by International Ski Federation. The season started on 12 December 2007 and ended on 16 March 2008. This season included four disciplines: aerials, moguls, ski cross and halfpipe.

Dual mogul counted together with moguls ranking and for moguls title.

Men

Moguls

Aerials

Ski Cross

Halfpipe

Ladies

Moguls

Aerials

Ski Cross

Halfpipe

Men's standings

Overall 

Standings after 30 races.

Moguls 

Standings after 10 races.

Aerials 

Standings after 9 races.

Ski Cross 

Standings after 8 races.

Halfpipe 

Standings after 3 races.

Ladies' standings

Overall 

Standings after 30 races.

Moguls 

Standings after 10 races.

Aerials 

Standings after 9 races.

Ski Cross 

Standings after 8 races.

Halfpipe 

Standings after 3 races.

Nations Cup

Overall 

Standings after 60 races.

Men 

Standings after 30 races.

Ladies 

Standings after 30 races.

References

FIS Freestyle Skiing World Cup
2007 in freestyle skiing
2008 in freestyle skiing